Events from the year 1687 in Sweden

Incumbents
 Monarch – Charles XI

Events

  Eric Dahlbergh becomes Governor of Jönköping County.
 The process against the Sami Erik Eskilsson for maintaining his Sami shamanism during the Christianization of the Sami.

Births

 Hedvig Elisabet Strömfelt, royal governess (died 1751)

Deaths

 24 October- Countess Palatine Maria Eufrosyne of Zweibrücken, princess (born 1625)

References

 
Years of the 17th century in Sweden
Sweden